The 2022 German Football League season is the 43rd edition of the top-level American football competition in Germany.

The regular season started on 21 May and ended on 28 August 2022, followed by the play-offs. The season culminated in the German Bowl XLIII, which was held on 2 October 2022 in Frankfurt, where the north champion Potsdam Royals met the south champion Schwäbisch Hall Unicorns. The Unicorns won their 5th German title with a 44–27 victory.

Modus

The league is divided in two conferences, north and south, and both conferences are divided in two divisions. During the regular season each club plays all other clubs in its division twice, home and away, and the teams of the other division of its conference once, resulting in each team playing 10 regular season games.

The best four teams in each conference qualify for the play-offs where, in the quarter finals, teams from opposite conferences play each other, whereby the better placed teams have home field advantage. The first placed team plays the fourth placed from the other conference and the second placed the third placed team. From the semi-finals onwards teams from the same conference can meet again.

The eighth placed team in the southern conference enters a two-leg play-off with the winner of the respective conference of the German Football League 2, the second tier of the league system in Germany. The winner of this contest qualifies for the GFL for the following season.

League tables

GFL
The league tables of the two GFL divisions:

North

South

GFL2
The league tables of the two GFL2 divisions:

North

South

Postseason

Relegation and Promotion round

In the Southern Division the Frankfurt Universe withdrew from playing the relegation game against Ingolstadt Dukes.

Playoffs

References

External links
 Official GFL website 

German
Football League
German Football League seasons